Walker is an English and German surname.

With close to 100,000 bearers, Walker is the 18th most common surname in England. As of the 2000 U.S. Census, 501,307 people had the surname Walker, making it the 28th most common surname in America. It is the 14th most common surname in Australia, with 26,688 people as of 2007.

Notable people with the surname

A
Abby Walker, American actress
Abi Walker, Scottish surgeon
Abram Joseph Walker (1819–1872), American judge
Ada Hill Walker (1879–1955), British illustrator
Adele Walker (born 1976), British biathlete
Admiral Walker (1898–2001), American baseball player
Adrian Walker, American journalist
Adrian Walker (computer scientist), American computer scientist
Aida Overton Walker (1880–1914), American actress
Aidee Walker (born 1981), New Zealand actress
Al Walker (born 1959), American basketball coach
Alan Walker (born 1997), British-born Norwegian DJ, YouTuber, and record producer
Alasdair Walker (1956–2019), British doctor
Albertina Walker (1929–2010), American singer-songwriter
Aldace F. Walker (1842–1901), American railroad executive
A'Lelia Walker (1885–1931), American businesswoman
Alexia Walker (born 1982), English cricketer
Alf Walker (1884–1961), English football manager
Alick Walker (1925–1999), British paleontologist
Alison Walker, Scottish broadcaster
Alison Walker (scientist), English physicist
Alistair Walker (1944–2021), English racing driver
Alister Walker (born 1982), English squash player
Alleyne Walker, Grenadian politician
Ally Walker (born 1961), American actress
Alta Walker (1942–2015), American geologist
Alvin Walker (1954–2022), American football player
A. Maceo Walker (1909–1994), American businessman
Amanda Walker (born 1935), English actress
Amani Walker (born 1989), Jamaican footballer
Amara Walker (born 1981), American journalist
Amasa Walker (1799–1875), American politician
Amelia Himes Walker (1880–1974), American suffragist
Amy Walker (born 1982), American actress
Andre Walker (born 1956), American hairstylist
Angus Walker (born 1939), Canadian musician
Annabel Walker, English author
Annor Walker, Ghanaian football coach
Antoine Walker (born 1976), American basketball player
Antonio Walker (born 1961), Chilean politician and lawyer
Antony Walker (born 1934), British army officer
Antony Walker (conductor), Australian conductor
April Walker (born 1943), British actress
Archibald Walker (1858–1945), Scottish rugby union footballer
Arnetia Walker, American actress
A. S. Walker (1826–1896), American judge
Asa Walker (1845–1916), American admiral
Ash Walker, English musician
Ashlie Walker, British acting coach
Asiedu Walker (born 1955), Ghanaian politician
Astia Walker (born 1975), Jamaican athlete
Audrey Walker (1928–2020), American textile artist
Aundrey Walker (born 1993), American football player
Austin Walker (1883–1945), American politician
Ayana Walker (born 1979), American basketball player

B
Baldwin Wake Walker (1802–1876), English naval officer
Barry Walker (born 1968), American rugby league footballer
Beau Walker (born 1985), Australian surfer
Ben Walker (born 1976), American rugby league footballer
Bertrand N. O. Walker (1870–1927), American native poet
Beth Walker (judge) (born 1965), American judge
Bettina Walker (1837–1893), Irish pianist
Betty Walker (1928–1982), American actress
Blythe Walker (born 1968), Bermudian sailor
Bracy Walker (born 1970), American football player
Brady Walker (1921–2007), American basketball player
Brandon Walker (born 2002), Australian rules footballer
Bree Walker (born 1953), American radio personality
Breeana Walker (born 1992), Australian bobsledder
Brenda Walker (born 1957), Australian writer
Bret Walker (born 1954), Australian barrister
Brett Walker (1961–2013), American songwriter
Brígida Walker (1863–1942), Chilean teacher
Bryant Walker (1856–1936), American malacologist
Bub Walker (1907–1963), American football player
Butch Walker (born 1969), American musician
Byron Walker (born 1960), American football player
Byron Edmund Walker (1848–1924), Canadian banker

C
Carl Walker (1934–2022), English police inspector
Carlene M. Walker (born 1947), American politician
Carmaine Walker (born 1979), English footballer
Carole Walker, British news correspondent
Caroline Holme Walker (1863-1955), American composer
Carolyn Walker (born 1945), American politician
Cas Walker (1902–1998), American businessman
Casey Walker (born 1989), American football player
Casey Walker (baseball) (1912–1998), American baseball player
Cavon Walker (born 1994), American football player
Cecil Walker (1924–2007), Northern Irish politician
Cedric Walker (born 1971), American football player
Chad N. Walker, American filmmaker
Challis Walker (1912–2000), American sculptor
C. Harding Walker (1859–1934), American politician
Charlotte Walker (1876–1958), American actress
Charls Walker (1923–2015), American treasurer
Ché Walker, English actor
Cherryl Walker, South African professor
Chev Walker (born 1982), English rugby league footballer
Chevon Walker (born 1987), Jamaican-American football player
Chico Walker (born 1957), American baseball player
Christian Walker (born 1991), American baseball player
Chuck Walker (born 1941), American football player
Chuck Walker (racing driver) (born 1963), American stock car racing driver
Cindy Walker (1918–2006), American songwriter
Claiborne Walker (1899–1927), American fencer
Clarissa Walker (??–2011), American activist
Claudia Walker (born 1996), English footballer
Clay Walker (born 1969), American singer-songwriter
Clay Walker (filmmaker) (born 1968), American filmmaker
Clement Walker (??–1651), English politician
Cleo Walker (born 1948), American football player
Clint Walker (1927–2018), American actor
Clinton Walker (born 1957), Australian writer
Clifford Walker (1877–1954), American politician
Clifford Walker (cricketer) (1919–1992), English cricketer
Colleen Walker (1956–2012), American golfer
Colonel James Walker (1846–1936), Canadian pioneer
Colt Walker (gymnast) (born 2001), American artistic gymnast
Constantine Walker (born 1951), Jamaican singer-songwriter
Cora Walker (1922–2006), American lawyer
Cora Faith Walker (1984–2022), American politician
Corey D. B. Walker, American sociologist
Cory Walker (born 1980), American comic book artist
Curtis Walker (born 1961), British actor

D
Daisy Walker (born 2002), Australian rules footballer
Dallas Walker (born 1988), American football player
D'Andre Walker (born 1997), American football player
Danielle Walker (born 1985), American writer
Danielle Walker (politician) (born 1976), American politician
Danville Walker, Jamaican politician
Darby Walker (born 1974), Canadian ice hockey player
Darius Walker (born 1985), American football player
Darnell Walker (born 1970), American football player
Darrell Walker (born 1961), American basketball coach
Darren Walker (born 1959), American lawyer and banker
Darren Walker (cricketer) (born 1966), Australian cricketer
Darwin Walker (born 1977), American football player
Daryl Walker (born 1981), American goalball player
Dave Walker (born 1945), British singer
Davie Walker (1884–1935), English footballer
Dawn Walker, Australian politician
Dawn Walker, Canadian writer better known by the pen name Dawn Dumont
Dawson Walker (1916–1973), Scottish football manager
Dean Walker (born 1962), English footballer
Delanie Walker (born 1984), American football player
Deloss Walker (1931–1996), American advertiser
DeMarcus Walker (born 1994), American football player
DeMya Walker (born 1977), American basketball player
Denard Walker (born 1973), American football player
Denis Walker (born 1933), Zimbabwean politician
Denis Walker (activist) (1947–2017), Australian activist
Derel Walker (born 1991), American football player
Derrick Walker (born 1945), British auto racing owner
Derrick Walker (American football) (born 1967), American football player
Des Walker (born 1965), English footballer
Devin G. Walker, American physicist
Devon Walker (born 1990), American football player
Devon Walker (comedian), American comedian
DeVon Walker (born 1985), American football player
Devondrick Walker (born 1992), American basketball player
DeWayne Walker (born 1960), American football coach
Dexter Walker (footballer) (born 1971), Saint Vincentian footballer
Diana Barnato Walker (1918–2008), British pilot
Dianne Walker (born 1951), American tap dancer
Dixie Walker (1910–1982), American baseball player
Dixie Walker (pitcher) (1887–1965), American baseball player
Django Walker (born 1981), American singer-songwriter
Doak Walker (1927–1998), American football player
Dobby Walker (1919–2009), American lawyer
Donny Walker (born 1980), American mixed martial artist
Dora Walker (1890–1980), British boat skipper
Doug Walker (comedian), (Born 1981) showrunner and star of the American review comedy web series Nostalgia Critic
D. Ormonde Walker (1890–1955), American academic administrator
D. P. Walker (1914–1985), English historian
Dublin Walker, American politician
Dugald Stewart Walker (1883–1937), American illustrator
Duncan Walker (1899–1963), Scottish footballer
Duncan Stephen Walker (1841–1912), American brigadier general
Dwight Walker (born 1959), American football player

E
Eamonn Walker (born 1962), British actor
E. C. Walker (1820–1894), American politician
Edmund Murton Walker (1877–1969), Canadian entomologist
Edsall Walker (1910–1997), American baseball player
Egan Walker (born 1961), American lawyer
E. Jean Walker, American academic
Eli Walker (born 1992), Welsh rugby union footballer
Elkanah Walker (1805–1877), American pioneer
Ella May Walker (1892–1960), Canadian-American artist
Elle Walker, American vlogger
Elliot Walker, British sculptor
Elliott Walker (born 1956), American football player
Elyse Walker (born 1967), American fashion designer
Emery Walker (1851–1933), English photographer
Emily Wilson Walker (1904-2007), American doctor
Emmett H. Walker Jr. (1924–2007), American lieutenant general
Erica N. Walker (born 1971), American mathematician
Ericka Walker (born 1981), American artist
Ernesto Walker (born 1999), Panamanian footballer
Erving Walker (born 1990), American basketball player
Erwin Walker (1917–2008), American policeman
Esther Walker (1894–1943), American comedian
Ethan Walker (born 2002), English footballer
Ethel Walker (1861–1951), Scottish painter

F
F. Ann Walker (??–2022), American chemist
Fiona Walker (born 1944), English actress
Fiona Walker (author) (born 1969), English author
Flem Walker, American general
Foots Walker (born 1951), American basketball player
François Walker (1888–1951), French gymnast
Fraser Walker (born 1972), Scottish medley swimmer
Fredi Walker (born 1962), American actress
Freeman Walker (1780–1827), American politician

G
Galal Walker (born 1943), American professor
Garry Walker (born 1974), Scottish conductor
Gee Walker (1908–1981), American baseball player
Gene Walker (1893–1924), American motorcycle racer
Geordie Walker (born 1958), English musician
Georgia Walker (born 1998), Australian rules footballer
Georgina Walker (born 1985), English table tennis player
Gerald Walker (born 1987), American rapper
Gerran Walker (born 1983), American football player
Gertrude Walker (1902–1995), American screenwriter
Giles Walker (1946–2020), Scottish-Canadian film director
Gina Luria Walker, American professor
Glen Walker (born 1952), American football player
Gordie Walker (born 1965), Canadian ice hockey player
Gus Walker (1912–1986), English pilot
Gwyneth Van Anden Walker (born 1947), American composer

H
Hal Walker (1896–1972), American director
Hamish Walker (born 1985), New Zealand politician
Harriet G. Walker (1841–1917), American hospital administrator
Hazel Walker (1914–1990), American basketball player
Hazel M. Walker (1889–1960), American lawyer
Helene Walker (1904–1994), British trade unionist
Henderson Walker (1659–1704), English politician
Herschel Walker (born 1962), American football player
Herwig Walker (born 1972), Austrian footballer
Hezekiah Walker (born 1962), American musician
Hilda Annetta Walker (1877–1960), English sculptor
Hilman Walker (1912–1983), American football player
Hiram Walker (1816–1899), American entrepreneur
H. M. Walker (1884–1937), American scriptwriter
Holly Walker (born 1982), New Zealand politician
Horace Walker (1838–1908), English mountaineer
Horace Walker (basketball) (1937–2001), American basketball player
Horatio Walker (1858–1938), Canadian painter
Hoss Walker (1904–1984), American baseball player
Hovenden Walker (1656–1728), British naval officer
Hub Walker (1906–1982), American baseball player
Hunter Walker (born 1984), American reporter

I
Iain Walker (born 1976), British diplomat
Ida Walker (1876–1968), American politician
Ignacio Walker (born 1956), Chilean politician
Ivy Walker (1911–??), English athlete

J
Jabari Walker (born 2002), American basketball player
Jabez K. Walker, American politician
Jamall Walker (born 1977), American basketball coach
Jamar K. Walker, American lawyer
Jamil Walker (born 1981), American soccer player
Janet Walker, Canadian scholar
Janet Walker (costumier) (1850–1940), Australian businesswoman
Jarace Walker (born 2003), American basketball player
Jarrett Walker (born 1962), American transit consultant
Jarvis Walker (basketball) (born 1966), American basketball player
Jasmine Walker (born 1998), American basketball player
Javon Walker (born 1978), American football player
Jayden Walker (born 1996), Italian rugby league footballer
J. Brent Walker (born 1950), American minister and lawyer
Jean Nellie Miles Walker (1878–1918), Australian nurse
Jearl Walker (born 1945), American physicist
Jefferson Cobb Walker (1845–??), American politician
Jemma Walker, English actress
Jenny Walker (born 1956), Australian tennis player
Jenonne R. Walker (born 1934), American ambassador
Jerald Walker, American writer
Jermaine Walker (born 1977), American basketball player
Jerry Walker (born 1939), American baseball player
Jerry Jeff Walker (1942–2020), American singer-songwriter
Jesse Walker (born 1970), American editor
Jesse Walker (Methodist) (1766–1835), American minister
Jessica Walker (born 1990), British canoeist
Jessie Walker (born 1994), English cyclist
J. H. Walker (1860–1947), American land commissioner
Jimmie Walker (born 1947), American actor and comedian
Joan Walker, Canadian writer
Joaquín Garrigues Walker (1933–1980), Spanish politician
Johnny "Big Moose" Walker (1927–1999), American blues pianist and organist
Jon Walker (born 1985), American musician
Josiah Walker (1761–1831), Scottish author
Josie Walker (born 1970), Northern Irish actress
Joyce Walker (born 1961/1962), American basketball player
J. P. Walker (born 1976), American snowboarder
J. Samuel Walker, American historian
Judy L. Walker, American mathematician
Julian Walker (born 1986), Swiss ice hockey player
Julian F. Walker (1929–2018), British cartographer
Julius Waring Walker Jr. (1927–2003), American diplomat
Junior Walker (1931–1995), American instrumentalist

K
Kara Walker (born 1969), American artist
Kara Odom Walker, American physician
Kareem Walker (born 1998), American football player
Katie Walker (born 1969), British furniture designer
Katie Walker (netball) (born 1978), Australian netball player
Kathryn Walker (born 1943), American actress
Keenan A. Walker, American researcher
Keenyn Walker (born 1990), American baseball player
Kelley Walker (born 1969), American artist
Kemba Walker (born 1990), American professional basketball player
Ken Walker (1919–2013), Australian rules footballer
Kenney Walker (born 1988), American soccer player
Kenronte Walker (born 1990), American football player
Kent Walker, American corporate executive
Kenyatta Walker (born 1979), American football player
Kerry Walker (born 1948), Australian actress
Kev Walker, British comic artist
Kirk Walker, American softball coach
Kristen Walker, Australian lawyer
Kristina Walker (born 1996), Canadian rower
Kyle Walker (born 1990), English footballer
Kyle Walker (politician), American politician
Kyree Walker (born 2000), American basketball player

L
Lamar Walker (born 2000), Jamaican footballer
Lance E. Walker (born 1972), American judge
Lancelot Walker (1829–1907), New Zealand politician
Landry Walker (born 1971), American writer
Langston Walker (born 1979), American football player
Larrington Walker (1946–2017), Jamaican-British actor
Lary Walker, American neuroscientist
Latrice Walker (born 1979), American politician
Laudie Walker (1898–1962), American baseball player
Lauren Walker (born 1989), English footballer
LaVar Walker, American comedian
Leanne Walker (born 1968), New Zealand basketball player
Lee Walker (born 1976), Welsh snooker player
Lee Walker (footballer) (born 1973), Australian rules footballer
Len Walker (born 1944), English footballer
Léon Walker (1937–2006), Swiss footballer
Leonard Walker (1877–1964), British painter
Les Walker, South African bishop
Les Walker (politician) (born 1965), Australian politician
Lesley Walker, British film editor
Lewis L. Walker (1873–1944), American politician
Lewis Walker (footballer) (born 1999), English footballer
Liam Walker (born 1988), Gibraltarian footballer
Lillian Walker (1887–1975), American actress
Lillian Walker (politician) (1923–2016), American politician
Lily Walker (born 2002), English field hockey player
Linda T. Walker (born 1960), American judge
Livingstone Walker (1879–1940), English cricketer
Liza Walker (born 1972), English actress
Lonnie Walker (born 1998), American basketball player
Lorna Walker, British historian
Lorraine Walker, Australian judge
Lou Ann Walker, American author
Louie Walker (born 1953), American football player
L. T. Walker, American football coach
Lucas Walker (born 1984), Australian basketball player
Lucius M. Walker (1829–1863), American soldier
Luise Walker (1910–1998), Austrian composer
Luther Walker (1864–1903), English footballer
Lyman Walker (1799–1886), American politician
Lyman Fessenden Walker (1836–1920), American shipbuilder
Lyndsay Walker (born 1974), Australian cricketer

M
Mack Walker (1929–2021), American historian
Madam C. J. Walker (1867–1919), American entrepreneur
Maggie L. Walker (1864–1934), American businesswoman
Mandy Walker (born 1963), Australian cinematographer
Magnus Walker (born 1967), British fashion designer
Mallory Walker (1935–2014), American musician
Mamie Dowd Walker (1880–1960), American judge
Marco Walker (born 1970), Swiss footballer
Marcy Walker (born 1961), American actress
Marietta Walker (1834–1930), American academic administrator
Marilyn Walker, American computer scientist
Marilyn I. Walker (1934–2015), Canadian artist
Marion Walker, Scottish activist
Marquis Walker (born 1972), American football player
Marquise Walker (born 1978), American football player
Marty Walker (1899–1978), American baseball player
Matías Walker (born 1973), Chilean politician
Max Walker (1948–2016), Australian cricketer
Max Walker (actor) (born 1986), Canadian actor
Maxine Walker (born 1962), British-Jamaican photographer
Meadow Walker (born 1998), American model
Megan Walker (born 1998), American basketball player
Melaine Walker (born 1983), Jamaican hurdler
Melissa Walker (born 1977), American author
Meriwether Lewis Walker (1869–1947), American brigadier general
Merv Walker (born 1952), Canadian football player
Miles Walker (born 1940), English businessman and politician
Miles Walker (tennis) (born 1961), American tennis player
M. J. Walker (born 1998), American basketball player
Molly Manning Walker (born 1993), English cinematographer
Monica Walker (born 1987), American curler
Monica Walker (illustrator), British illustrator
Mort Walker (1923–2018), American cartoonist
Moses B. Walker (1819–1895), American general
Moses Fleetwood Walker (1856–1924), American baseball player
Murdoch Walker (??–1580), Scottish stonemason
Murray Walker (1923–2021), English journalist
Murphy Walker (born 1999), Scottish rugby union footballer
Mykal Walker (born 1997), American football player
Mysterious Walker (1884–1958), American athlete and coach

N
Nancy Walker (1922–1992), American actress
Naomi Ruiz Walker (born 1992), Spanish artistic gymnast
Natalie Walker, American vocalist
Natalie Walker (actress), Australian actress
Nate Walker (born 1952), American businessman
Nathan Walker (born 1994), Australian ice hockey player
Nefertiti A. Walker, American academic administrator
Nella Walker (1886–1971), American actress
Nellie Walker (1874–1973), American sculptor
Nellie Craig Walker (1881–1969), American teacher
Neva Walker (born 1971), American politician
Nicky Walker (born 1962), Scottish footballer
Nico Walker (born 1985), American author
Nicola Walker (born 1970), English actress
Nicole Walker (writer), American writer
Niel Walker (1895–1960), British cricketer
Nikki Walker (born 1982), Scottish rugby union footballer
Norma Ford Walker (1893–1968), Canadian scientist
Norma O. Walker (born 1928), American politician

O
Obadiah Walker (1616–1699), English academic
Obie Walker (1911–1989), American boxer
Olene Walker (1930–2015), American politician
Ordell Walker, American football coach
Orris George Walker (1942–2015), American bishop
Oscar Walker (1854–1889), American baseball player
Owen Walker, New Zealand computer hacker

P
Pamela Gaye Walker, American actress
Pat Walker (born 1959), Irish footballer
Patricia Stilwell Walker, American philatelist
Patricio Walker (born 1969), Chilean politician
Paul Walker (1973–2013), American actor
Peahead Walker (1899–1970), American football and baseball coach
Percy Walker (1812–1880), American politician
Pete Walker (baseball) (born 1969), American baseball coach and player
Pinkney H. Walker (1815–1885), American jurist
P. J. Walker (born 1995), American football player
Polly Walker (born 1966), English actress
Purcy Walker (born 1951), American politician

Q
Quay Walker (born 2000), American football player
Quentin Walker (born 1961), American football player
Quock Walker (1753–??), American slave

R
Ramon Walker (born 1979), American football player
Rana Walker, American psychologist
Ranginui Walker (1932–2016), New Zealand academic and writer
Rasheed Walker (born 2000), American football player
Regan Walker (born 1996), English footballer
Reuben Lindsay Walker (1827–1890), American general
Rhys Walker (born 1994), English badminton player
Rick Walker (born 1955), American football player
Ricky Walker (born 1996), American football player
Rod Walker (born 1976), American football player
Roderick Walker (1932–2008), British military officer
Roland Walker (born 1970), British army officer
Roman Walker (born 2000), Welsh cricketer
Rose A. Walker (1879–1942), Australian painter
Rosa Kershaw Walker (??–1909), American author
Roslyn Walker (born 1981), English entertainer
Roslyn Walker (curator), American curator
Rowan Walker (born 1970), Australian runner
R. T. Walker (1914–?), American baseball player
R. Tracy Walker (1939–2019), American politician
Rube Walker (1926–1992), American baseball player
Rudolph Walker (born 1939), Trinidadian actor
Ruel C. Walker (1910–1998), American judge
Russell Walker (1842–1922), English cricketer
Ryley Walker (born 1989), American singer-songwriter
Rysa Walker (born 1961), American writer

S
Samaki Walker (born 1976), American basketball player
Sampson Walker (1843–1933), English-Canadian businessman
Sandy Walker (born 1942), American artist
Sara Imari Walker, American physicist
Sears Cook Walker (1805–1853), American astronomer
Sebo Walker (born 1988), American skateboarder
Seth Walker (born 1972), American guitarist
Shannon Walker (born 1965), American physicist
Shannon Walker (rugby) (born 1988), Australian rugby union footballer
Shelby Walker (1975–2006), American boxer
Sherron Walker (born 1956), American athlete
Shiloh Walker (born 1976), American author
Shirley Walker (1945–2006), American composer
Skeeter Werner Walker (1933–2001), American skier
S. Lynne Walker, American journalist
Solomon Walker, American guitarist
Sophie Walker (born 1971), British activist
Speed Walker (1898–1959), American baseball player
Speedy Walker (1906–2004), American basketball player
Steele Walker (born 1996), American baseball player
Stéphane Walker (born 1990), Swiss figure skater
Stephanie Walker (born 1994), Australian rules footballer
Sullivan Walker (1946–2012), Trinidadian actor
Summer Walker (born 1996), American singer-songwriter
Suzanne Walker, American microbiologist
Syd Walker (1886–1945), British actor
Sydney Walker (1921–1994), American actor
Sylford Walker (born 1955), Jamaican singer
Sylvia Walker (1937–2004), American professor

T
Taijuan Walker (born 1992), American baseball player
Tamara Walker (born 1966), American singer-songwriter
T. B. Walker (1840–1929), American businessman
T-Bone Walker (1910–1975), American musician
Ted Walker (1934–2004), English poet
Terence Walker (born 1935), British politician
Terri Walker (born 1979), English singer-songwriter
Thelma Walker (born 1957), British politician
Theresa Walker (1807–1876), Australian sculptor
Tippy Walker (born 1947), American actress
Tirame Walker (born 1975), American basketball player
Tisha Walker (born 1975), American figure skater
Todd Walker (born 1973), American baseball player
Tonette Walker (born 1955), American social figure
Toni Walker (born 1952), American politician
Tonja Walker (born 1960), American soap opera actress
Tony Walker (outfielder) (born 1959), American baseball player
Tony Walker (Negro leagues), American baseball player
Tracy Walker (American football) (born 1995), American football player
Travis Walker (born 1979), American boxer
Travon Walker (born 2000), American football player
Tray Walker (1992–2016), American football player
Trent Walker, American sound engineer
Trevor Walker, Barbadian politician
Tricia Walker (1964–2018), British author
Tristan Walker (born 1991), Canadian luger
Tristan Walker (entrepreneur), American corporate executive
Tristen Walker (born 1984), Australian rules footballer
Tyrunn Walker (born 1990), American football player

U
Uncle Homer Walker (1898–1980), American banjo player
Uroyoán Walker, American academic administrator

V
Val Walker (1890–1969), English magician
Val Joe Walker (1930–2013), American football player
Vance Walker (born 1987), American football player
Vanessa Siddle Walker, American professor
Vaughn Walker (born 1944), American judge
V. E. Walker (1837–1906), English cricketer
Vernon L. Walker (1894–1948), American cinematographer
Vicki Walker (born 1956), American politician
Victor B. Walker (1864–??), American lawyer and businessman
Vincent Walker (born 1980), American singer
Virginia Walker (1916–1946), American film actress
Vordell Walker (born 1982), American professional wrestler

W
Wade Walker (1923–2013), American football player
Wally Walker (born 1954), American basketball player
Walt Walker (1860–1922), American baseball player
Walton Walker (1889–1950), American general
Waurine Walker (1908–1987), American educator
W. Danforth Walker, American philatelist
Weldy Walker (1860–1937), American baseball player
Wendell Walker (born 1952), American politician
Wendy Jane Walker (born 1964), English actress
Wickliffe Walker (born 1946), American canoeist
Wilbert Walker (born 1985), Jamaican triple jumper
Willis Walker (1892–1991), English footballer
Williston Walker (1860–1922), American historian
Winifred Walker (1882–1965), English artist
Wirt Dexter Walker (1860–1899), American lawyer
Wyatt Tee Walker (1928–2018), American pastor and activist

Z
Zain Walker (born 2002), English footballer
Zena Walker (1934–2003), English actress

Disambiguation pages

A
Aaron Walker (disambiguation)
Abraham Walker (disambiguation)
Adam Walker (disambiguation)
Alan Walker (disambiguation)
Albert Walker (disambiguation)
Alexander Walker (disambiguation)
Alfred Walker (disambiguation)
Alice Walker (disambiguation)
Allan Walker (disambiguation)
Andrew Walker (disambiguation)
Andy Walker (disambiguation)
Angela Walker (disambiguation)
Ann Walker (disambiguation)
Anna Walker (disambiguation)
Anne Walker (disambiguation)
Annie Walker (disambiguation)
Anthony Walker (disambiguation)
Arnold Walker (disambiguation)
Art Walker (disambiguation)
Arthur Walker (disambiguation)
Ashley Walker (disambiguation)

B
Barbara Walker (disambiguation)
Benjamin Walker (disambiguation)
Bert Walker (disambiguation)
Bill Walker (disambiguation)
Billy Walker (disambiguation)
Bob Walker (disambiguation)
Brad Walker (disambiguation)
Brian Walker (disambiguation)
Brooke Walker (disambiguation)
Bruce Walker (disambiguation)
Bryan Walker (disambiguation)

C
Cameron Walker (disambiguation)
Caroline Walker (disambiguation)
Charles Walker (disambiguation)
Cheryl Walker (disambiguation)
Chris Walker (disambiguation)
Christopher Walker (disambiguation)
C. J. Walker (disambiguation)
Clarence Walker (disambiguation)
Clive Walker (disambiguation)
Cody Walker (disambiguation)
Colin Walker (disambiguation)
Connie Walker (disambiguation)
Craig Walker (disambiguation)
Cyril Walker (disambiguation)

D
Dan Walker (disambiguation)
Daphne Walker (disambiguation)
David Walker (disambiguation)
Dennis Walker (disambiguation)
Derek Walker (disambiguation)
Dominic Walker (disambiguation)
Don Walker (disambiguation)
Dorothy Walker (disambiguation)
Douglas Walker (disambiguation)

E
Ed Walker (disambiguation)
Edward Walker (disambiguation)
Edwin Walker (disambiguation)
Elaine Walker (disambiguation)
Eliza Walker (disambiguation)
Elizabeth Walker (disambiguation)
Eric Walker (disambiguation)
Ernest Walker (disambiguation)
Evan Walker (disambiguation)

F
Felix Walker (disambiguation)
Francis Walker (disambiguation)
Frank Walker (disambiguation)
Frederick Walker (disambiguation)

G
Gary Walker (disambiguation)
Geoff Walker (disambiguation)
George Walker (disambiguation)
Gilbert Walker (disambiguation)
Glenn Walker (disambiguation)
Gordon Walker (disambiguation)
Graham Walker (disambiguation)
Gregory Walker (disambiguation)

H
Hamilton Walker (disambiguation)
Harold Walker (disambiguation)
Harry Walker (disambiguation)
Helen Walker (disambiguation)
Henry Walker (disambiguation)
Herbert Walker (disambiguation)
Howard Walker (disambiguation)
Hugh Walker (disambiguation)

I
Ian Walker (disambiguation)
Isaac Walker (disambiguation)

J
Jack Walker (disambiguation)
Jackie Walker (disambiguation)
Jake Walker (disambiguation)
James Walker (disambiguation)
Jamie Walker (disambiguation)
Jane Walker (disambiguation)
Jason Walker (disambiguation)
Jay Walker (disambiguation)
J. C. Walker (disambiguation)
Jeff Walker (disambiguation)
Jeremy Walker (disambiguation)
Jimmy Walker (disambiguation)
Joe Walker (disambiguation)
Joel Walker (disambiguation)
John Walker (disambiguation)
Johnnie Walker (disambiguation)
Jonathan Walker (disambiguation)
Jordan Walker (disambiguation)
Joseph Walker (disambiguation)
Josh Walker (disambiguation)
Joshua Walker (disambiguation)
Julie Walker (disambiguation)
Justin Walker (disambiguation)

K
Karen Walker (disambiguation)
Kate Walker (disambiguation)
Katherine Walker (disambiguation)
Keith Walker (disambiguation)
Kenneth Walker (disambiguation)
Kevin Walker (disambiguation)
Kim or Kimberly Walker
Kurt Walker (disambiguation)

L
Larry Walker (disambiguation)
Laura Walker (disambiguation)
Laurie Walker (disambiguation)
Lawrence Walker (disambiguation)
Leroy Walker (disambiguation)
Leslie Walker (disambiguation)
Lisa Walker (disambiguation)
Lucy Walker (disambiguation)
Luke Walker (disambiguation)
Lynne Walker (disambiguation)

M
Mabel Walker (disambiguation)
Malcolm Walker (disambiguation)
Marcus Walker (disambiguation)
Margaret Walker (disambiguation)
Mark Walker (disambiguation)
Martin Walker (disambiguation)
Mary Walker (disambiguation)
Matt Walker (disambiguation)
Matthew Walker (disambiguation)
Mel Walker (disambiguation)
Michael Walker (disambiguation)
Mick Walker (disambiguation)
Mike Walker (disambiguation)
Mitch Walker (disambiguation)

N
Neil Walker (disambiguation)
Nick Walker (disambiguation)
Nigel Walker (disambiguation)
Norman Walker (disambiguation)

O
Oliver Walker (disambiguation)

P
Pat Walker (disambiguation)
Patrick Walker (disambiguation)
Paul Walker (disambiguation)
Peter Walker (disambiguation)
Phil Walker (disambiguation)
Phillip Walker (disambiguation)

R
Rachel Walker (disambiguation)
Ralph Walker (disambiguation)
Randy Walker (disambiguation)
Ray Walker (disambiguation)
Rebecca Walker (disambiguation)
Reggie Walker (disambiguation)
Richard Walker (disambiguation)
Rob Walker (disambiguation)
Robert Walker (disambiguation)
Robin Walker (disambiguation)
Rodney Walker (disambiguation)
Roger Walker (disambiguation)
Ronald Walker (disambiguation)
Roy Walker (disambiguation)
Russ Walker (disambiguation)
Ryan Walker (disambiguation)

S
Sally Walker (disambiguation)
Sam Walker (disambiguation)
Sammy Walker (disambiguation)
Samuel Walker (disambiguation)
Sarah Walker (disambiguation)
Scott Walker (disambiguation)
Sean Walker (disambiguation)
Shane Walker (disambiguation)
Shaun Walker (disambiguation)
Simon Walker (disambiguation)
Stanley Walker (disambiguation)
Stephen Walker (disambiguation)
Steve Walker (disambiguation)
Stewart Walker (disambiguation)
Stuart Walker (disambiguation)
Sue Walker (disambiguation)
Susan Walker (disambiguation)

T
Tanya Walker (disambiguation)
Taylor Walker (disambiguation)
Terry Walker (disambiguation)
Thomas Walker (disambiguation)
Timothy Walker (disambiguation)
Ty Walker (disambiguation)
Tyler Walker (disambiguation)

W
Walter Walker (disambiguation)
Wayne Walker (disambiguation)
William Walker (disambiguation)

Fictional characters
Allen Walker, on the Manga series D.Gray-man
 Brenda Walker, in the American sitcom television series The Hogan Family
Brenda Walker, on the soap opera Emmerdale
Captain Martin Walker, main character of the video game Spec Ops: The Line
Cordell Walker, main character of the television show Walker, Texas Ranger
Dexter Walker, on the soap opera Home and Away
Gennie Walker, on the soap opera Emmerdale
Indi Walker, on the soap opera Home and Away
 James Walker, the hidden antagonist from Missing (2023 film)
Dr. Julia Walker, on the television series Helix
Julia Walker, on the television series Brothers & Sisters
Karen Walker, on the sitcom series Will & Grace
Kate Walker, main character of the Syberia video game series
Molly Walker, on the drama series Heroes
Nicole Walker, on the soap opera Days of Our Lives
Nora Walker, on the television series Brothers & Sisters
Patsy Walker, from the comic series Marvel Comics
Private Walker, on the television series Dad's Army
Renee Walker, on the television series 24
Saint Walker, from the comic series DC Comics
Sarah Walker, on the television series Chuck (TV series)
Sid Walker, on the soap opera Home and Away

See also
Walker (given name), a page with people for the given name "Walker"
Walker (disambiguation), a disambiguation page for "Walker"
Walker (taxonomic authority), the taxonomic authority titled "Walker"
Admiral Walker (disambiguation), a disambiguation page for Admirals surnamed "Walker"
Attorney General Walker (disambiguation), a disambiguation page for Attorney Generals surnamed "Walker"
Captain Walker (disambiguation), a disambiguation page for Captains surnamed "Walker"
General Walker (disambiguation), a disambiguation page for Generals surnamed "Walker"
Governor Walker (disambiguation), a disambiguation page for Governors surnamed "Walker"
Justice Walker (disambiguation), a disambiguation page for Justices surnamed "Walker"
Lord Walker (disambiguation), a disambiguation page for Lords surnamed "Walker"
Senator Walker (disambiguation), a disambiguation page for Senators surnamed "Walker"

References

English-language surnames
German-language surnames
Occupational surnames
English-language occupational surnames
es:Walker
fr:Walker
it:Walker
he:ווקר (פירושונים)
ja:ウォーカー
no:Walker
pt:Walker
fi:Walker
vo:Walker